Managee can be:
It's not a valid English term but it's used mainly in India.
In management, a person who is managed (the opposite of a manager).
In computing theory, a process or application that is managed by another process or application.